Chondrinoidea is a superfamily of small air-breathing land snails and terrestrial mollusks in the infraorder Pupilloidei .

Families
 Chondrinidae Steenberg, 1925
 Truncatellinidae Steenberg, 1925
Synonyms
 Subfamily Columellinae Schileyko, 1998: synonym of Truncatellinidae Steenberg, 1925

References

External links
 Saadi, A. J.; Mordan, P. B.; Wade, C. M. (2021). Molecular phylogeny of the Orthurethra (Panpulmonata: Stylommatophora). Zoological Journal of the Linnean Society.

 
Gastropod superfamilies